Pathamudayam is a 1985 Indian Malayalam-language action thriller film directed by J. Sasikumar and written by S. L. Puram Sadanandan. It is a remake of the 1976 Hindi film Kalicharan, and the film stars Mohanlal, Urvashi, M. G. Soman and T. G. Ravi; Mohanlal played dual roles (for the first time in a film) as Sub-Inspector Jayamohan and Vikraman. The film features music composed by Darsan Raman.This film is considered to be one of the first blockbusters of Mohanlal.

Plot
Menon is supposedly an honest rich man and a clean-hearted guy. However all this is a facade as he is a terror called LION in the world of crime. He is the man under whom black-marketing, smuggling and robberies flourish. No one has an idea about his evil deeds. Not even his close friend IG B. G. Menon. Menon is very worried at the sorry state of affairs in the city and state.

The government requests to bring back Inspector Jayamohan to the city as he is an honest and fearless cop. Jayamohan comes to town and starts cracking on the criminals with an iron hand. Jayamohan is the son of IG Menon and is a widower who has two small children.  After making substantial raids, Jayamohan learns that Lion C. Menon is a corrupt man and a demon for the society. He plans to spill the beans in front of everyone, but is killed by Lion C. Menon's men. Before dying, he keeps a typical clue for the police to nab the criminal, but nobody is able to understand what the clue says.

Menon is heartbroken and he loses hope in life. Due to a friend he learns that there is a ferocious prisoner Vikraman in a jail who resembles Jayamohan. Menon visits him, but finds him a beastly figure. Still in an attempt to trace the criminal, he gets him released and takes him to a hill station where he attempts to transform him. But Vikrman is a tough nut to crack. However, after some time it is Jayamohan's sister-in-law who wins the heart of the fugitive.

Vikrman was in prison as he had murdered the people who had raped his lover. He was still in search of the main culprit Bhadran. Vikrman makes peace with Menon and slowly but steadily transforms into a police inspector. He manages to win the heart of Valsala and even the kids of Jayamohan accept him as their father. He finds the truth behind Jayamohan's murder and brings Lion C. Menon to the hands of law. In the process, he manages to win friends like Rahim and eliminate his old enemy Bhadran.

Cast
 
Mohanlal as Sub-Inspector Jayamohan and Vikraman (dual role)
Urvashi as Valsala 
M. G. Soman as B. G. Menon 
T. G. Ravi as Lion C. Menon 
Balan K. Nair as Rahim 
K. P. A. C. Azeez as Gopinath 
Poojappura Ravi as Kuttan Pillai 
Aranmula Ponnamma as B. G. Menon's sister 
Chitra as Amminikutty 
Unnimary as Sarada 
C. I. Paul as Bhadran

Soundtrack
The film features songs composed by Darsan Raman and background score by K. J. Joy.

The film was a commercial success

References

External links
  
 

1985 films
1980s Malayalam-language films
Malayalam remakes of Hindi films
Indian action thriller films
Films directed by J. Sasikumar